Baker Nunatak is a nunatak standing  northwest of Mount Brecher in the northern Wisconsin Range of the Horlick Mountains of Antarctica. It was mapped by the United States Geological Survey from surveys and from U.S. Navy air photos, 1959–60, and named by the Advisory Committee on Antarctic Names for Travis L. Baker, a meteorologist in the Byrd Station winter party, 1961.

References 

Nunataks of Marie Byrd Land